Andrew Capicik (born 22 March 1973) is a Canadian freestyle skier. He was born in Toronto. He competed at the 1994 Winter Olympics in Lillehammer, where he placed fourth in aerials. He also competed at the 1998 Winter Olympics in Nagano and at the 2002 Winter Olympics in Salt Lake City.

References

1973 births
Living people
Skiers from Toronto
Canadian male freestyle skiers
Freestyle skiers at the 1994 Winter Olympics
Freestyle skiers at the 1998 Winter Olympics
Freestyle skiers at the 2002 Winter Olympics
Olympic freestyle skiers of Canada